Awards Daily (formerly known as Oscarwatch) is a website primarily focused on the film industry and the film awards seasons that was established in 1999 by American editor Sasha Stone.

History
Awards Daily was started in 1999 by Sasha Stone, a writer for entertainment industry magazines who had previously worked for Variety, The Hollywood Reporter, and The Wrap. Originally called Oscarwatch, it was launched as a website covering the race for the Academy Awards from start to finish. It was later expanded to include a television coverage section as well. In addition, the site also features movie trailers, film scripts, previews of upcoming movies and interviews. In 2006, it was renamed Awards Daily after the Academy of Motion Picture Arts and Sciences sued Stone for copyright infringement due to the use of Oscarwatch as the site's name for eight years prior.

Awards Daily started holding an annual poll that recognizes excellence in both American and international film and television. The winners are chosen by the National Film Critics Circle, which comprises more than 100 film critics nationwide, and are generally announced during the first half of the year. In October 2010, Awards Daily launched a weekly podcast called Oscar Poker. Guests have included Fran Walsh, Peter Berg, Sarah Paulson, and Rachel Weisz.

Since its founding, Awards Daily has received a Shorty Award nomination. It has been used as a source on NPR's Weekend Edition and regularly collaborates with the awards prediction website Gold Derby. It was profiled by Boris Kachka in New York Magazine about the growing industry of Oscar punditry, which Awards Daily helped launch.

See also
 Gold Derby

References

External links
 

1999 establishments in the United States
American film websites
American entertainment news websites
Internet properties established in 1999